Jochen Schümann (born 8 June 1954 in East Berlin) is a German sailor and three-time Olympic champion.

He competed at the 1976 Summer Olympics in Montreal, where he won a gold medal in the finn class.

He competed in the Soling class at the 1988, 1996 and 2000 Summer Olympics, winning two gold medals and one silver medal in this class.

America's Cup Team Alinghi
Schümann participated and won the 2003 and 2007 America's Cup for Swiss Team Alinghi acting as sporting director.

ALL4ONE Challenge
He is currently involved with ALL4ONE Challenge in the Louis Vuitton Trophy.

Awards
He received the 1996 World Sailor of the Year Award from the International Sailing Federation.

See also
 List of athletes with the most appearances at Olympic Games
 List of people from Berlin

References

External links

  (German Democratic Republic)
  (Germany)
 
 

1954 births
Living people
2000 America's Cup sailors
2003 America's Cup sailors
5.5 Metre class sailors
Alinghi sailors
European Champions Soling
German male sailors (sport)
ISAF World Sailor of the Year (male)
Medalists at the 1976 Summer Olympics
Medalists at the 1988 Summer Olympics
Medalists at the 1996 Summer Olympics
Medalists at the 2000 Summer Olympics
Olympic gold medalists for East Germany
Olympic gold medalists for Germany
Olympic medalists in sailing
Olympic sailors of East Germany
Olympic sailors of Germany
Olympic silver medalists for Germany
People from East Berlin
People from Treptow-Köpenick
Recipients of the Patriotic Order of Merit
Recipients of the Silver Laurel Leaf
Sailors at the 1976 Summer Olympics – Finn
Sailors at the 1980 Summer Olympics – Finn
Sailors at the 1988 Summer Olympics – Soling
Sailors at the 1992 Summer Olympics – Soling
Sailors at the 1996 Summer Olympics – Soling
Sailors at the 2000 Summer Olympics – Soling
Sportspeople from Berlin
World Champions in 5.5 Metre
World champions in sailing for Germany
Soling class world champions